Holman's Bar and Grill, also known as Holman's Restaurant or simply Holman's, is a bar and restaurant in Portland, Oregon.

Description

Located at the intersection of 28th Avenue and Burnside Street in southeast Portland's the Buckman neighborhood (at the Kerns boundary), Holman's has been described by Jennifer Anderson of the Portland Tribune as a "neighborhood burger joint". The bar has a "free meal wheel", allowing patrons a chance to dine at no cost.

Holman's has a DIY Bloody Mary bar; other menu options include chicken fried steak, hamburger sliders, fried macaroni and cheese bites, and the Peanut Butter Bacon Burger. Eggs, bacon, hash browns, and potatoes O'Brien are offered for brunch. Pinball is available.

History
The business was established in 1933. Judy Craine became the owner in 1976.

In 2020, when the business was forced to close temporarily because of the COVID-19 pandemic, a handwritten sign saying "Booze is all gone" was displayed in the window.

Reception
In 2016, Eater Portland included Holman's in a list of "Portland's 25 Oldest Restaurants Worth Checking Out", and Alex Frane of Thrillist included the business in "Portland's Cocktail Bucket List: The 50 Drinks to Try Before You Die". Frane described Holman's as "a classic Portland dive" and highlighted the Bloody Mary bar. Pete Cottell included the "quick-start special" in a 2017 list of "Portland's 10 Best Scumbag Breakfasts".

See also
 List of dive bars

Reception

External links

 
 
 Holman's Bar & Grill at Zomato

1933 establishments in Oregon
Buckman, Portland, Oregon
Dive bars in Portland, Oregon
Restaurants established in 1933